Amir Halaby (born August 19, 1986) is an Israeli-Druze football player.

References

External links
 
 

1986 births
Living people
Israeli Druze
Israeli footballers
Druze sportspeople
Maccabi Netanya F.C. players
Israeli Premier League players
People from Daliyat al-Karmel
21st-century Israeli people
Association footballers not categorized by position